"A Hazy Shade of Winter" is a song by American music duo Simon & Garfunkel, released on October 22, 1966, initially as a stand-alone single, but subsequently included on the duo's fourth studio album, Bookends (1968). It peaked at number 13 on the Billboard Hot 100.

In 1987, the Bangles recorded a cover version for the soundtrack of the film Less than Zero, which peaked at number two on the Billboard Hot 100. In 2019, Gerard Way and Ray Toro recorded a cover version for the Netflix Original series The Umbrella Academy.

Background

The duo recorded "A Hazy Shade of Winter" during the sessions for Parsley, Sage, Rosemary and Thyme (1966), but the song was not included on an album until 1968's Bookends.

Composition
"A Hazy Shade of Winter" follows a more rock-tinged sound, with a fairly straightforward verse-refrain structure. The song dates back to Simon's days in England in 1965; it follows a hopeless poet, with "manuscripts of unpublished rhyme", unsure of his achievements in life.

The lyrics recall the transition from fall to winter, as suggested by the repetition of the final chorus of the song:

I look around,leaves are brownAnd the skyis a hazy shade of winterLook around,leaves are brownThere's a patch of snow on the ground.

Author and disc jockey Pete Fornatale considered the lyrics evocative of, and standing in contrast with, those of John Phillips' "California Dreamin'".

Reception
Billboard described the song as a "winning number" and a "change of tempo for the duo [which] could make this their biggest to date."  Cash Box said that it is a "strong session bound for biggiesburg."  Decades later, Allmusic critic Richie Unterberger described the song as "one of [Simon and Garfunkel's] best songs, and certainly one of the toughest and more rock-oriented."

Chart history

Weekly charts

The Bangles version

In 1987, the Bangles were approached to record a song for the soundtrack of the film Less than Zero. They chose to record a cover of "A Hazy Shade of Winter", which they had been performing live as early as March 1983.

Their cover, retitled "Hazy Shade of Winter", was a harder-edged rock song that removed most of the bridge section. The record, like the rest of the soundtrack album, was produced by Rick Rubin. After a fruitful but disappointing experience with producer David Kahne for their album Different Light during which they had little say on production, the group’s greater involvement in recording led to an additional producer credit for the band. Michael Steele later commented that "we sounded the most on this record the way we actually sound live".

Lead vocals were performed jointly by all four members of the group, with a short solo led by Susanna Hoffs towards the end. This was a rare occurrence in The Bangles songs, as they mostly had just one member singing lead. Due to pressure from their record label, The Bangles removed the verse from the original song that contained the line "drinking my vodka and lime". According to liner notes on the soundtrack album, Steve Bartek from the band Oingo Boingo played acoustic guitar on the track.

When released as a single in November 1987, "Hazy Shade of Winter" became a huge hit, surpassing the popularity of the original version, peaking at number 2 on the Billboard Hot 100, behind Tiffany's "Could've Been", and also number 11 in the UK. It was also a hit around Europe.

The music video (the first for future country music video director Jim Shea) showed the group singing in a studio surrounded by television screens on the walls, similar to a scene from the film Less than Zero, from which other scenes appear throughout the video.

"Hazy Shade of Winter" was not included on any of the group's studio albums, but later appeared on their first official Greatest Hits in 1990, and on many of their subsequent compilations. The accompanying video compilation for Greatest Hits  did not include the promo for "Hazy Shade of Winter", due to complications with the licensing of the movie rights of the scenes from Less than Zero that appear within the video clip.

The song appears during season 1, episode 2 of the Netflix series Stranger Things, episode 9 of The Assassination of Gianni Versace: American Crime Story, season 6, episode 9 of the Netflix series Lucifer, and season 1, episode 1 of (as well as promotional trailers for) the Amazon Prime Video series Paper Girls.

Chart history
Weekly charts

Year-end charts

Gerard Way version

Gerard Way released a version of "Hazy Shade of Winter" in January 2019 for the Netflix series The Umbrella Academy. The track is based on The Bangles' cover, and features fellow My Chemical Romance member Ray Toro on guitar and bass, and Jarrod Alexander on drums.

Credits
Credits adapted from Tidal.
 Gerard Way – main artist
 Ray Toro – guitar, bass
 Doug McKean – production, record engineering, mixing
 Jarrod Alexander – drums
 Jamie Muhoberac – keyboards
 Ted Jensen – mastering

Charts

References

Sources

External links
 Lyrics at www.simonandgarfunkel.com
 Lyrics at www.paulsimon.com

1966 singles
1987 singles
Simon & Garfunkel songs
The Bangles songs
Songs written by Paul Simon
Song recordings produced by Rick Rubin
Song recordings produced by Bob Johnston
Song recordings produced by Paul Simon
Song recordings produced by Art Garfunkel
Columbia Records singles
Def Jam Recordings singles
Reprise Records singles
1966 songs